Williams station is a light rail station of the San Francisco Municipal Railway's Muni Metro system located in the median of Third Street at Williams and Van Dyke Avenues in Bayview, San Francisco, California, United States. The station opened along with the T Third Street line on January 13, 2007. It has two side platforms; the northbound platform is north of Williams Avenue, and the southbound platform south of Williams Avenue, so that trains can pass through the intersection before the station stop. A wye for trains to reverse directions is located two blocks south at Armstrong Avenue, allowing Williams station to be the terminus of short turn trains when necessary.

References

External links 

SFMTA: Third Street & Williams Ave northbound, southbound
SF Bay Transit (unofficial): Third Street & Williams Ave

Muni Metro stations
Railway stations in the United States opened in 2007